The Key is the debut studio album from American technical death metal band Nocturnus. It was released on Earache Records on 1st October 1990.

A concept album, The Key is centered on an occult (the influence of drummer/vocalist Mike Browning) meets sci-fi (influenced by guitarist Mike Davis) theme. The story follows a cyborg who travels back in time to the year 0 B.C. to assassinate Jesus Christ which leads to the destruction of Christianity (highlighted by the controversial track "Destroying the Manger") and the creation of a modern empire.

In addition to their unusual lyrical content, the band employed the use of keyboards which was virtually unheard of at the time in the broader genre of death metal. The keyboards were generally used for song intros and more atmospheric purposes, however, and most of the album was based upon a more conventional guitar and drums approach, with Kam Lee of Massacre providing backing vocals.

Due to the increased complexity and experimentation, some have considered the release to be the first progressive death metal album.

Browning has claimed that he has not seen any royalties from either this album or its follow up since he was kicked out of the band, blaming both former band members and Earache Records.

Track listing

Personnel

Nocturnus
Mike Browning - lead vocals, drums, percussion
Mike Davis - lead and rhythm guitar
Sean McNenney - lead and rhythm guitar
Jeff Estes - bass guitar
Louis Panzer - keyboards

Additional personnel
Kam Lee - backing vocals

Production
Produced by Tom Morris and Nocturnus
Engineered by Tom Morris; recorded at Morrisond Studio, Florida
Cover art by Dan Seagrave
Logo by R.P. Roberts
All music by Nocturnus
Lyrics on tracks 1, 2, 3, and 5 by Mike Browning
Lyrics on tracks 4, 6, 7, and 9 by Mike Browning and Mike Davis
Lyrics on track 8 by Mike Browning, Mike Davis, and Louis Panzer

References

External links
Nocturnus fan site
Metal Archives

1990 debut albums
Nocturnus albums
Earache Records albums
Concept albums
Albums recorded at Morrisound Recording
Albums with cover art by Dan Seagrave